Lacs de Clairvaux are two lakes at Clairvaux-les-Lacs in the Jura department of France. The Grand Lac has a surface area of 56.5 ha, the Petit Lac of 17 ha.

Clairvaux